The South African Railways Class 5E1, Series 5 of 1966 was an electric locomotive.

Between 1966 and 1969, the South African Railways placed 225 Class 5E1, Series 5 electric locomotives with a Bo-Bo wheel arrangement in mainline service.

Manufacturer
Series 5 of the Metropolitan-Vickers-designed 3 kV DC Class 5E1 electric locomotive was built for the South African Railways (SAR) by Union Carriage and Wagon (UCW) in Nigel, Transvaal, with the electrical equipment being supplied by Associated Electrical Industries (AEI) and English Electric (EE).

The 225 Series 5 locomotives were delivered between 1966 and 1969, numbered in the range from E921 to E1145. The Series 5 were equipped with four AEI 281 BX axle-hung traction motors fitted with roller bearings. UCW did not allocate builder’s numbers to the locomotives it built for the SAR and used the SAR unit numbers for their record keeping.

Body shape alteration
From the introduction of the Class 5E, Series 1 in 1955, the body shape of the locomotive remained virtually unchanged apart from the roofline on the roof access ladder side, where the Class 5E had a single cut-out in line with the vertical row of three grilles on the body side while the Class 5E1 had an additional cut-out in line with the small window to the right of the two grilles aft of the roof access ladder. All these units had round headlamps and rounded corners on their cab ends.

This body shape was changed to smaller round headlamps and squared body corners part-way through the construction of the Series 5. The first 25 Series 5 units in the number range from E921 to E945 were built with the same large round headlamps and rounded body corners as before, but from  the next 200 were delivered with smaller headlights and the new body shape which gave them the appearance of being wider. The change was possibly motivated by cost considerations since the squared corners would simplify construction and since the rounded corners served no purpose other than cosmetic.

Other identifying features remained the same, such as the three small square access panels on the lower sides above the battery box instead of the two larger rectangular panels in the same position on the Series 1 and 2 units. An example is depicted alongside showing a damaged  with two rectangular access panels above the battery box instead of three small square ones, but still with one small square and one larger rectangular access panels on the lower sides above the second axle from the left. The picture also illustrates the new front with squared corners and a smaller round headlight.

Headlamps
In the 1970s most serving SAR steam and electric locomotives had their original large round headlamps replaced by less attractive but more efficient double sealed-beam automobile headlamps. On Series 3, 4 and early series 5 units, the original round headlamp housing was retained and the glass was replaced by a metal disk containing the sealed beam headlamps. On Series 5 units with squared corners, the smaller round headlamp was replaced by sealed-beam automobile headlamps on the original or a similar rectangular backing plate above the end door.

Service

The Class 5E1 family served in goods and passenger working on all 3 kV DC electrified mainlines country-wide for about forty years. They worked the vacuum-braked goods and mainline passenger trains over the lines radiating south, west and north of Durban almost exclusively until the mid-1970s and the Class 6E1 only became regular motive power in Natal when air-braked car trains began running between Durban and the Reef. By the mid-2000s, most of the Series 5 locomotives had been withdrawn.

Liveries
The whole series was delivered in the Gulf Red livery with signal red cowcatchers, yellow whiskers, full body-length side-stripes and with the number plates on the sides enclosed in three-stripe wings. In the 1970s the side-stripes were curtailed to just beyond the cab-sides, but with the number plates on the sides still enclosed in three-stripe wings. In the 1990s many of the Series 5 units were repainted in the Spoornet orange livery.

Modification
By 2007 two Series 5 locomotives, numbers E1101 and E1102, had been modified extensively. It involved a complete strip-down overhaul to rebuild them as prototypes with the object to determine if large-scale Class 5E1 rebuilding would be economically viable.

Some visible external differences from the originals were side window screens, higher side doors with a curved rainwater gutter above it (not done on E1101) and reinforcing under the side doors and side windows. On the roof access ladder side the cut-outs on the roof edge were filled in and the units were repainted in the then current Spoornet blue livery with outline numbers, the only Class 5E1s to receive this livery. They were also equipped with driver’s consoles similar to those which were later fitted to the Class 18Es.

No further such rebuilds were done. By 2010, these two units were shedded at Danskraal in Ladysmith and used to push road trainers, modified cabooses with Class 5E1 controls installed in one end, that are used to familiarise drivers with routes.

Rovos Rail

Several Series 5 locomotives were sold at auction during 2010. Most were bought by scrap dealers and cut up, but some survived to start a second career. Nine Class 5E1, Series 5 units were purchased by Rovos Rail, a private operator of luxury rail tours which is based at Capital Park in Pretoria. Rovos Rail is reviving the tradition of brass number plates on the sides of their locomotives.

Years of construction and disposal
The known years of construction based on the observation of the UCW works plates on the end doors of units, and the post-withdrawal disposition of the Class 5E1, Series 5 are listed in the table.

Illustration
The main picture shows no. E941 with rounded corners, while the first picture below shows no. E948 with squared corners, both in the modified SAR Gulf Red and whiskers livery. The rest of the pictures illustrate some of the liveries which were applied to Series 5 locomotives.

References

2850
Bo-Bo locomotives
Metropolitan-Vickers locomotives
Union Carriage & Wagon locomotives
Cape gauge railway locomotives
Railway locomotives introduced in 1966
1966 in South Africa